May 16 - Eastern Orthodox Church calendar - May 18

All fixed commemorations below celebrated on May 30 by Orthodox Churches on the Old Calendar.

For May 17th, Orthodox Churches on the Old Calendar commemorate the Saints listed on May 4.

Saints
 Apostles Andronicus of Pannonia and his fellow labourer Junia, of the Seventy Apostles (1st century)
 Martyrs Solochon, Pamphamer, and Pamphalon, soldiers, at Chalcedon (c. 286-305)
 Martyrs Adrion, Victor and Basilla, in Alexandria.
 Saint Theodoret of Antioch, Hieromartyr, (361–363)
 Venerable Dodo of the St David-Gareji Monastery, Georgia (6th century)
 Saint Stephen the New, Patriarch of Constantinople (893)

Pre-Schism Western saints
 Saint Restituta the martyr, in Carthage (255 or 304)
 Martyrs Heradius, Paul, and Aquilinus, near Lake Geneva (284-305)
 Saint Maden (Madern, Madron, Madrona) (c. 545)
 Saint Cathán (Catan, Chattan, Cadan), Bishop in the Isle of Bute in Scotland (6th century)
 Saint Mailduf (Maidulph, Maelduib), founder of Malmesbury Abbey (673)
 Saint Gerebernus (Gerebern, Gerebrand), Hieromartyr, priest from Ireland who accompanied St Dymphna to Belgium and shared in her martyrdom (7th century)
 Saint Rasso (Ratho), ascetic, founder of a Benedictine abbey at Wörth, later named Grafrath after him (953)

Post-Schism Orthodox saints
 Venerable Andronik the Grave-Digger, of the Kyivan Zverynetsky Monastery (1096)
 Venerable Eudoxia of Moscow (in monasticism Euphrosyne), Grand-Duchess of Moscow (1407)
 Saints Nectarius (1550) and Theophanes (1544) the gate-keepers, brothers, of Meteora
 Great-martyr Nicholas of Sofia (1555)
 Saint Nicolas (Basdanis) the New Martyr (St Nicolas the Vlach) (1617)
 Saint Athanasius the New, Bishop and Wonderworker of Christianoupolis (1707 or 1735)

 Saint Jonah Atamansky, Archpriest of Odessa, Wonderworker (1924)

Other commemorations
 Commemoration of the Fall of Jerusalem in 614 AD to the Persians, with the loss of the True Cross to Persia, damage to the Church of the Holy Sepulchre by fire, and the martyrdom of over 65,000 Christians (614)
 Translation of the relics (1551) of Saint Adrian of Ondrusov (Valaam), Abbot (1549)

Icon gallery

Notes

References

Sources
 May 17/30. Orthodox Calendar (ORTHOCHRISTIAN.COM).
 May 30 / May 17. HOLY TRINITY RUSSIAN ORTHODOX CHURCH (A parish of the Patriarchate of Moscow).
 May 17. OCA - The Lives of the Saints.
 Dr. Alexander Roman. May. Calendar of Ukrainian Orthodox Saints (Ukrainian Orthodoxy - Українське Православ'я).
 May 17. Latin Saints of the Orthodox Patriarchate of Rome.
 May 17. The Roman Martyrology.
Greek Sources
 Great Synaxaristes:  17 ΜΑΪΟΥ. ΜΕΓΑΣ ΣΥΝΑΞΑΡΙΣΤΗΣ.
  Συναξαριστής. 17 Μαΐου. ECCLESIA.GR. (H ΕΚΚΛΗΣΙΑ ΤΗΣ ΕΛΛΑΔΟΣ).
Russian Sources
  30 мая (17 мая). Православная Энциклопедия под редакцией Патриарха Московского и всея Руси Кирилла (электронная версия). (Orthodox Encyclopedia - Pravenc.ru).
  17 мая (ст.ст.) 30 мая 2013 (нов. ст.). Русская Православная Церковь Отдел внешних церковных связей. (DECR).

May in the Eastern Orthodox calendar